Lorenzkirche station is a Nuremberg U-Bahn station, located on the U1 line.

References

Nuremberg U-Bahn stations
Railway stations in Germany opened in 1978
1978 establishments in West Germany